Kebun Bahru is a small town in the northern part of Tangkak District, Johor, Malaysia.

Tangkak District
Towns in Johor